Ameles syriensis is a species of praying mantis found in Syria and Turkey.

References

Syriensis
Mantodea of Asia
Insects of the Middle East
Insects of Turkey
Insects described in 1915